Sardarabad (also Romanized as Sardārābād) is a village in Sardaran Rural District, in the Central District of Kabudarahang County, Hamadan Province, Iran. At the 2006 census, its population was 1,569, in 388 families.

References 

Populated places in Kabudarahang County